Laumann is a surname. Notable people with the name include:

Arthur Laumann (1894–1970), German World War I flying aces
Daniele Laumann (born 1961), Canadian rower
Edward Laumann (born 1938),  American sociologist
Joseph Laumann (born 1983), German footballer
Karl-Josef Laumann (born 1957), German politician 
Martin Laumann Ylven (born 1988), Norwegian ice hockey players
Silken Laumann (born 1964), Canadian rower

See also
Schönberger-Laumann 1892, Austrian semi-automatic pistol

de:Laumann